Excluded from the Public (German: Unter Ausschluß der Öffentlichkeit) is a 1927 German silent drama film directed by Conrad Wiene and starring Werner Krauss, Maly Delschaft and Vivian Gibson. It was shot at the Staaken Studios in Berlin. The film's sets were designed by the art director Robert A. Dietrich.

Cast
 Werner Krauss as Ibrahim Hulam 
 Maly Delschaft as Eva - die Schwester 
 Vivian Gibson as Anita - die Tochter 
 William Dieterle as Fritz Sehring 
 Henry Stuart as Hans v. Romberg 
 Ida Wüst as Bibiana de la Motte 
 Jakob Tiedtke as Eberhard v. Schlenk 
 Julius Falkenstein as Herr v. Bisam 
 Karl Elzer as Charly 
 Grete Schmidt
 Hermann Picha
 Dodge Sisters

References

Bibliography
 Paul Matthew St. Pierre. Cinematography in the Weimar Republic: Lola Lola, Dirty Singles, and the Men Who Shot Them. Rowman & Littlefield, 2016.

External links

1927 films
Films of the Weimar Republic
German silent feature films
Films directed by Conrad Wiene
German black-and-white films
1927 drama films
1920s German films
German drama films
Films shot at Staaken Studios